Marius Păcurar (born 15 July 1974) is a Romanian former footballer who played as a striker for teams such as Corvinul Hunedoara, Foresta Fălticeni, Politehnica Iași or CFR Simeria, among others.

Honours
Foresta Fălticeni
Divizia B: Winner (1) 1999–2000

Politehnica Iași
Divizia B: Winner (1) 2003–04

Other performances
Corvinul Hunedoara
Divizia B: Top scorer 1993–94

References

External links
 
 

1974 births
Living people
People from Hunedoara County
Romanian footballers
Association football forwards
Liga I players
Liga II players
CS Corvinul Hunedoara players
FC Politehnica Iași (1945) players
CS Mioveni players
CSM Deva players